The National Outstanding Children's Literature Award is a major literary award in China, established in 1986. It is run by the China Writers Association, and is awarded every three years in the categories of novels, picture books, poetry, essays and non-fiction.

It was one of a series of literary awards organised on a national level from 1978, typically known as "National Outstanding" prizes. In the 1950s there had been awards for theatrical works and performance, but not for fiction, poetry and the other arts.

The First Awards (1980-1985)
Novels
Yan Zhen  严阵 《荒漠奇踪》
Yan Yan  颜烟 《盐丁儿》
Ke Yan  柯岩 《寻找回来的世界》
Xiao Yuxuan  萧育轩 《乱世少年》
Novellas
Cheng Wei  程玮 《来自异国的孩子》
Zheng Chunhua  郑春华 《紫罗兰幼儿园》
Short stories
Guan Xizhi  关夕之 《五虎将和他们的教练》
Qiu Xun  邱勋 《三色圆珠笔》
Cao Wenxuan  曹文轩 《再见了，我的星星》
Chang Xingang  常新港 《独船》
Shen Shixi  沈石溪 《第七条猎狗》
Liu Jingping  刘健屏 《我要我的雕刻刀》
Luo Chensheng  罗辰生 《白脖儿》
Zhang Yingwen  张映文 《扶我上战马的人》
Wure’ertu  乌热尔图 《老人和鹿》
Lin Jin  蔺瑾 《冰河上的激战》
Liu Houming  刘厚明 《阿城的龟》
Fang Guorong  方国荣 《彩色的梦》
Liu Xinwu  刘心武 《我可不怕十三岁》
Medium length Young readers
Lu Zhan  路展 《雁翅下的星光》
Zhu Zhixiang  诸志祥 《黑猫警长》
Ge Cuilin  葛翠琳 《翻跟头的小木偶》
Short Young readers
Sun Youjun  孙幼军 《小狗的小房子》
Zong Pu  宗璞 《总鳍鱼的故事》
Wu Mengqi  吴梦起 《老鼠看下棋》
Zhao Yanyi  赵燕翼 《小燕子和它的三邻居》
Zheng Yuanjie  郑渊洁 《开直升飞机的小老鼠》
Hong Xuntao  洪汛涛 《狼毫笔的来历》
Poetry
Gao Hongbo (writer)  高洪波 《我想》
Tian Di (writer)  田地 《我爱我的祖国》
Jin Bo (writer)  金波 《春的消息》
Fan Fajia  樊发稼 《小娃娃的歌》
Shen Aiping  申爱萍 《再给陌生的父亲》
Essays
Zhang Qi (writer)  张岐 《俺家门前的海》
Qiao Cuanzao  乔传藻 《醉麂》
Chen Danyan  陈丹燕 《中国少女》
Chen Yi (writer)  陈益 《十八双鞋》
Fables
Qu Yiri  曲一日 《狐狸艾克》
Reportage
Hu Jingfang  胡景芳 《作家与少年犯》
Dong Hongyou  董宏猷 《王江旋风》
Sci-fi
Zheng Wenguang  郑文光 《神翼》

The Second Awards (1986-1991)
Novels
Liu Jianping  刘健屏 《今年你七岁》
Shen Shixi  沈石溪 《一只猎雕的遭遇》
Qiu Xun  邱勋 《雪国梦》
Li Jianshu  李建树 《走向审判庭》
Luo Chensheng  罗辰生 《下世纪的公民们》
Qin Wenjun  秦文君 《少女罗薇》
Cao Wenxuan  曹文轩 《山羊不吃天堂草》
Guan Dengying 关登瀛 《西部流浪记》
Jin Cenghao  金曾豪 《狼的故事》
Cheng Wei  程玮 《少女的红发卡》
Han Huiguang  韩辉光 《校园喜剧》
Zhang Zhilu  张之路 《第三军团》
Chang Xingang  常新港 《青春的荒草地》
Ge Bing  葛冰 《绿猫》
Young readers
Zhang Qiusheng  张秋生 《小巴掌童话》
Zhou Rui  周锐 《扣子老三》
Zheng Yunqin  郑允钦 《吃耳朵的妖精》
Sun Youjun  孙幼军 《怪老头儿》
Jin Bo (writer)  冰波 《毒蜘蛛之死》
Essays and reportage
Wu Ran  吴然 《小鸟在歌唱》
Sun Yunxiao  孙云晓 《16岁的思索》
Guo Feng 郭风 《孙悟空在我们村子里》
Ban Ma  班马 《星球的细语》
Poetry
Xu Lu (writer)  徐鲁 《我们这个年纪的梦》
Jin Bo (writer)  金波 《在我和你之间》
Liu Bingjun  刘丙钧 《绿蚂蚁》
Picture books
Xie Hua  谢华 《岩石上的小蝌蚪》
Xue Weimin  薛卫民 《快乐的小动物》
Lu Bing (writer)  鲁兵 《虎娃》

The Third Awards (1992-1994)
Novels
Qin Wenjun  秦文君 《男生贾里》
Jin Cenghao  金曾豪 《青春口哨》
Dong Hongxian  董宏猷 《十四岁的森林》
Cong Weixi  从维熙 《裸雪》
Che Peijing  车培晶 《神秘的猎人》
Guan Dengyin  关登瀛 《小脚印》
Zhang Zhilu  张之路 《有老鼠片铅笔吗》
Shen Shixi  沈石溪 《红奶羊》
Young readers
Bing Bo  冰波 《狼蝙蝠》
Zhou Rui  周锐 《哼哈二将》
Zheng Yunqin  郑允钦 《树怪巴克夏》
Ge Cuilin  葛翠琳 《会唱歌的画像》
Poetry
Qiu Yidong  邱易东 《到你的远山去》
Jin Bo  金波 《林中月夜》
Essays
Gao Hongbo (writer)  高洪波 《悄悄话》
Long Pangmin  庞敏 《淡淡的白梅》
Su Shuyang  苏叔阳 《我们的母亲叫中国》
Picture books
Zhang Qiusheng  张秋生 《鹅妈妈和西瓜蛋》
Zheng Chunhua  郑春华 《大头儿子小头爸爸》

The Fourth Awards (1995-1997)
Novels
Jin Cenghao  金曾豪 《苍狼》
Qin Wenjun  秦文君 《小鬼鲁智胜》
Mei Zihan  梅子涵 《女儿的故事》
Cao Wenxuan  曹文轩 《草房子》
Huang Beijia  黄蓓佳 《我要做好孩子》
Yu Xiu  郁秀 《花季•雨季》
Novellas and short stories
Zhang Pincheng  张品成 《赤色小子》
Dong Hongxian  董宏猷 《一百个中国孩子的梦》
Young readers
Sun Youjun  孙幼军 《唏哩呼噜历险记》
Tang Sulan  汤素兰 《小朵朵与半个巫婆》
Bao Dongni  保冬妮 《屎克郎先生波比拉》
Zhang Zhilu  张之路 《我和我的影子》
Picture books
Wang Xiaoming  王晓明 《花生米样的云》
Zheng Chunhua  郑春华 《大头儿子和隔壁大大叔》
Ye Jun  野军 《长鼻子和短鼻子》
Poetry
Xue Weimin  薛卫民 《为一片绿叶而歌》
Essays
Liu Xianping  刘先平 《扇叶寻趣》
Non-fiction
Lin Fengjie  李凤杰 《还你一片蓝天》

The Fifth Awards (1998-2000)
Novels
Zhou Rui 周锐 and Zhou Shuangning  周双宁 《中国兔子德国草》
Huang Zhesheng  黄喆生 《吹响欧巴》
Fang Min  方敏 《大绝唱》
Qin Wenjun  秦文君 《属于少年刘格诗的自白》
Novellas and short stories
Xue Tao (writer)  薛涛 《随蒲公英一起飞的女孩》
Zhang Pincheng  张品成 《永远的哨兵》
Young readers
Tang Sulan  汤素兰 《笨狼的故事》
Essays
Gu Ying  谷应 《中国孩子的梦》
Wu Ran  吴然 《小霞客西南游》
Sun Youjun  孙幼军 《怪老头随想录》
Poetry
Jin Bo (writer)  金波 《我们去看海》
Wang Yizhen  王宜振 《笛王的故事》
Picture books
Zheng Chunhua  郑春华 《幼儿园的男老师》
Fables
Yu Yu  雨雨 《美食家狩猎》
Sci-Fi
Zhang Zhilu  张之路 《非法智慧》
Biography and non-fiction
Chao Yang (writer)  巢扬 《严文井评传》
Liu Xianping  刘先平 《黑叶猴王国探险记》
Young authors
Wang Yimei (writer)  王一梅 《书本里的蚂蚁》
Gao Kai  高凯和村小 《生字课》
Lin Yan  林彦 《单纯》

The Sixth Awards (2001-2003)
Novels
Cao Wenxuan  曹文轩 《细米》
Chang Xingang  常新港 《陈土的六根头发》
Shen Shixi  沈石溪 《鸟奴》
Yang Hongying  杨红樱 《漂亮老师和坏小子》
Novellas and short stories
Liu Dong (writer)  刘东 《轰然作响的记忆》
Young readers
Wang Yimei (writer)  王一梅 《鼹鼠的月亮河》
Bing Bo  冰波 《阿笨猫全传》
Jin Bo (writer)  金波 《乌丢丢的奇遇》
Xiong Lei  熊磊 《小鼹鼠的土豆》
Poetry
Wang Lichun  王立春 《骑扁马的扁人》
Essays
Jin Cenghao  金曾豪 《蓝调江南》
Non-fiction
Niu Niu  妞妞 《长翅膀的绵阳》
Literary Criticism
Xu Yan (writer)  徐妍 《凄美的深潭：“低龄化写作”对传统儿童文学的颠覆》
Young authors
San San (writer) 三三 《一只与肖恩同岁的鸡》
Zhai Haihong 赵海虹 《追日》

The Seventh Awards (2004-2006)
Novels
San San (writer)  三三 《舞蹈课》
Gerelchimeg Blackcrane  格日勒其木格•黑鹤 《黑焰》 - English translation Black Flame by Anna Holmwood (2013)
Xie Qianni  谢倩霓 《喜欢不是罪》
Li Xuebin  李学斌 《蔚蓝色的夏天》
Cao Wenxuan  曹文轩 《青铜葵花》 - English translation Bronze and Sunflower by Helen Wang (2015)
Novellas and short stories
Chang Xing’er  常星儿 《回望沙原》
Young readers
Pi Zhaohui  皮朝辉 《面包狼》
Ge Cuilin  葛翠琳 《核桃山》
Poetry
Zhang Xiaonan (poet)  张晓楠 《叶子是树的羽毛》
Essays
Peng Xuejun  彭学军 《纸风铃•紫风铃》
Non-fiction
Han Qingchen  韩青辰 《飞翔，哪怕翅膀断了心》
Sci-fi
Zhang Zhilu  张之路 《极限幻觉》
Young authors
Li Liping (writer)  李丽萍 《选一个人去天国》

The Eighth Awards (2007-2009)
Novels
Zheng Chunhua  郑春华 《非常小子马鸣加》
Huang Beijia  黄蓓佳 《你是我的宝贝》
Peng Xuejun  彭学军 《腰门》
Zeng Xiaojun  曾小春 《公元前的桃花》
Wang Jucheng  王巨成 《穿过忧伤的花季》
Yi Ping  翌平 《少年摔跤王》
Gerelchimeg Blackcrane  格日勒其木格•黑鹤 《狼獾河》
Xue Tao (writer)  薛涛 《满山打鬼子》
Cao Wenxuan  曹文轩 《黄琉璃》- English translation The Amber Tiles by Nicholas Stember (2015)
Young readers
Li Donghua (writer)  李东华 《猪笨笨的幸福时光》
Tang Sulan  汤素兰 《奇迹花园》
Jin Bo (writer)  金波 《蓝雪花》
Poetry
Xiao Ping  萧萍 《狂欢节，女王一岁了》
Essays
Wu Ran  吴然 《踩新路》
Picture books
Bai Bing (writer)  白冰 《狐狸鸟》
Reportage
Qiu Yidong  邱易东 《空巢十二月：留守中学生的成长故事》
Sci-fi
Zhang Zhilu  张之路 《小猪大侠莫跑跑•绝境逢生》
Wei Menghua  位梦华 《独闯北极》
Literary Criticism
Zhang Jinyi  张锦贻 《改革开放30年的少数民族儿童文学》
Young authors
Tang Tang (writer)  汤汤 《到你心里躲一躲》

The Ninth Awards (2010-2012)
Novels
Hu Jifeng  胡继风 《鸟背上的故乡》
Zhang Zhilu  张之路 《千雯之舞》
Deng Xiangzi  邓箱子 《像风一样奔跑》
Li Qiuyuan  李秋沅 《木棉•流年》
Chang Xingang  常新港 《五头蒜》
Cao Wenxuan  曹文轩 《丁丁当当•盲羊》 
Mu Ling  牧铃 《影子行动》
Poetry
Ren Rongrong  任溶溶 《我成了个隐身人》
An Wulin  安武林 《月光下的蝈蝈》
Young readers
Tang Tang (writer)  汤汤 《汤汤缤纷成长童话集》
Zuo Xuan  左昡 《住在房梁上的必必》
Xiao Mao  萧袤 《住在先生小姐城》
Liu Haiqi  刘海栖 《无尾小鼠历险记•没尾巴的烦恼》
Essays
Sun Weiwei  孙卫卫 《小小孩的春天》
Han Kaichun  韩开春 《虫虫》
Sci-fi
Hu Donglin  胡冬林 《巨虫公园》
Liu Cixin  刘慈欣 《三体3•死神永生》 - Death's End
Picture books
Zhang Jie (writer)  张洁 《穿着绿披风的吉莉》
Dan Yingqi  单瑛琪 《小嘎豆有十万个鬼点子•好好吃饭》
Young writers 
Chen Shige  陈诗哥 《风居住的街道》

The Tenth Awards (2013-2017)
A total of 18 prizewinners were announced. The chairs of the judging committee were Tie Ning 铁 凝 and Li Jingze 李敬泽, and the deputy chairs were Yan Jingming 阎晶明, Fang Weiping 方卫平 and Tang Sulan 汤素兰. The translated English titles below are approximate.
Novels
Dong Hongyou: A Hundred Children's Chinese Dream  董宏猷: 《一百个孩子的中国梦》
Mai Zi: Bear's Daughter   麦 子: 《大熊的女儿》 
Zhang Wei (author): Looking for the fish king  张 炜: 《寻找鱼王》 
Shi Lei (author): General's Hutong  史 雷: 《将军胡同》 
Xiao Ping: Muyang School Diary: I Just Love to Disagree  萧 萍: 《沐阳上学记•我就是喜欢唱反调》
Zhang Zhilu: Lucky Time  张之路: 《吉祥时光》 
Peng Xuejun: Tang Mu, Boy by the Pontoon Bridge  彭学军: 《浮桥边的汤木》 
Poetry
Wang Lichun: Gate to Dreams  王立春: 《梦的门》 
Young readers
Guo Jiangyan: The Deliveryman in Buluo Town  郭姜燕: 《布罗镇的邮递员》 
Lu Lina: The Little Girl's Name  吕丽娜: 《小女孩的名字》 
Tang Tang (author): Water spirit  汤 汤: 《水妖喀喀莎》 
Zhou Jing: A Thousand Leaping Flower Buds  周 静: 《一千朵跳跃的花蕾》 
Essays
Yin Jianling: Love - Grandma and Me  殷健灵: 《爱——外婆和我》
Reportage
Shu Huibo: Dreams are the Light of Life  舒辉波: 《梦想是生命里的光》 
Sci-fi
Wang Linbo: Saving the Genius  王林柏: 《拯救天才》 
Zhao Hua: Star-seekers in the Desert  赵 华: 《大漠寻星人》 
Picture books
Sun Yuhu: Actually, I'm a Fish  孙玉虎: 《其实我是一条鱼》 
Li Shabai: Dandelion Married Daughter 李少白: 《蒲公英嫁女儿》

The Eleventh Awards (2018-2021)
A total of 18 works were selected. The chair of the judging commmitte was Tie Ning 铁 凝 .
The translated titles below are approximate.
Novels
 《驯鹿六季》 Six Seasons of Reindeer
 《上学谣》 School Ballad
 《有鸽子的夏天》Summer with Pigeons
 《逐光的孩子》 Children Chasing the Light
 《陈土豆的红灯笼》The Red Lantern of Chen Tudou
 《巴颜喀拉山的孩子》 The Child of Bayan Kala Mountain
 《耗子大爷起晚了》 Uncle Mouse Was Late
Fairy Tales
 《慢小孩》 Slow Kids
 《南村传奇》 Forever Toy Store
 《南村传奇》 Legend of Nancun
 《小翅膀》Little Wings
Young Readers
 《小小小世界》 Little World
 《小巴掌童话诗·恐龙妈妈孵蛋》 Little Slap Fairy Tale 
Poems 
 《小巴掌童话诗·恐龙妈妈孵蛋》Dinosaur Mother Hatching Eggs
Science Fiction
 《奇迹之夏》 Summer of Miracles
 《中国轨道号》 China Track Number
 Poem
 《我和毛毛》 Mao Mao and Me
Essay
 《好想长成一棵树》 I want to grow into a tree
Short story by young authors
 《坐在石阶上叹气的怪小孩》 Sit The Weird Child Sighing on the Stone Steps

References

Chinese children's writers
Chinese children's literary awards
Children's literary awards
Chinese literary awards